Zębice  is a village in the administrative district of Gmina Siechnice, within Wrocław County, Lower Silesian Voivodeship, in south-western Poland. Prior to 1945 it was in Germany. The last German name of the village was Sambowitz.

References

Villages in Wrocław County